Philippe Folliot (born 14 July 1963 in Albi, Tarn) is a French politician who serves as a member of the National Assembly of France, representing the Tarn department. He is the founder of the Centrist Alliance.

Political career
Ahead of the 2012 presidential election, Folliot endorsed François Bayrou's candidacy as President of France. In 2013, Jean-Louis Borloo of the Union of Democrats and Independents (UDI) included Folliot in his shadow cabinet; in this capacity, he served as opposition counterpart to Minister of Defense Jean-Yves Le Drian.

In the 2017 legislative election, Folliot claimed the banner of the presidential majority without being explicitly invested by La République En Marche!. Following the election, he stood as a candidate for the National Assembly's presidency; in an internal vote within the LREM parliamentary group, he lost against François de Rugy. He came in last with the support of 32 deputies.

In parliament, Folliot serves on the Defence Committee. In addition to his committee assignments, he chairs the French-Egyptian Parliamentary Friendship Group.

Political positions
In July 2019, Folliot voted in favor of the French ratification of the European Union’s Comprehensive Economic and Trade Agreement (CETA) with Canada.

References

1963 births
Living people
People from Albi
Rally for the Republic politicians
Rally for France politicians
Union for French Democracy politicians
Centrist Alliance politicians
Toulouse 1 University Capitole alumni
Deputies of the 12th National Assembly of the French Fifth Republic
Deputies of the 13th National Assembly of the French Fifth Republic
Deputies of the 14th National Assembly of the French Fifth Republic
Deputies of the 15th National Assembly of the French Fifth Republic
Union of Democrats and Independents politicians
French Senators of the Fifth Republic